Convulse is a Finnish death metal band from Nokia, active between 1988 and 1994 and again since 2012. They were one of their country's first extreme metal bands and considered by some to be the forefathers of the local 'Nokia' metal scene.

History
Convulse was formed in 1988 under the name S.D.S. formed and consisted of singer and guitarist Rami Jämsä, bassist Juha "Patti" Telenius, drummer Janne Miikkulainen and guitarist Jani Kuhanen. After the group changed its name to Convulse, they released their first demo, Resuscitation of Evilness, in 1990. In 1991, Toni Honkala joined the band as the new guitarist. Through the demo, the band reached a deal with the French label Thrash Records, where the debut album World Without God was released. The single Lost Equilibrium followed in 1993 on Relapse Records. Then the recordings for the second album Reflections began. The work on this took place within a week at the Sunlight Studios in Sweden. In 1993, the band members enlisted in their mandatory military service before the album was released in the summer of 1994 after some delay via Relapse Records. They later broke up in the same year.

In 2012, Convulse was reformed and played some gigs in Finland. They were also confirmed for 2013's Maryland Deathfest. The band now consists of Jämsä, Telenius, and drummer Tomi Ylönen.[3]

Members
Final line-up
Rami Jämsä - guitar and vocals
Patti (Juha Telenius) - bass
Juppo Paavola - drums
Toni Honkala - guitar
Aki Yli-Salomäki - vocals

Previous members
Janne Miikkulainen - drums
Jani Kuhanen - guitar
Perttu Lind - drums
Kimmo Häkkilä - vocals

Discography
Demos
Rehearsal (1990)
Resuscitation of Evilness (1990)
Promo 1992 (1992)

Studio albums
World Without God (1991)
Reflections (1994)
Evil Prevails (2013)
Cycle of Revenge (2016)
Deathstar (2020)

EPs
Inner Evil (2013)

Singles
Lost Equilibrium (1993)

References

Finnish death metal musical groups
Musical groups established in 1988
Musical groups disestablished in 1994
Musical groups reestablished in 2012